Marisa Tomei is an American actress. Following her work on the television series As the World Turns, she came to prominence as a cast member on The Cosby Show spin-off A Different World in 1987.
After having minor roles in a few films, she came to international attention in 1992 with the comedy My Cousin Vinny, for which she received an Academy Award for Best Supporting Actress. She received two additional Academy Award nominations for In the Bedroom (2001) and The Wrestler (2008).

Tomei has appeared in a number of successful movies, including What Women Want (2000), Someone like You (2001), Anger Management (2003), Wild Hogs (2007), and Parental Guidance (2012). Other films include Untamed Heart (1993), Only You (1994), The Paper (1994), Unhook the Stars (1996), Welcome to Sarajevo (1997), Slums of Beverly Hills (1998), Before the Devil Knows You're Dead (2007), Cyrus (2010), Love Is Strange (2014), The Big Short (2015), and The First Purge (2018). She also portrays May Parker in the Marvel Cinematic Universe, having appeared in Captain America: Civil War (2016), Spider-Man: Homecoming (2017), Avengers: Endgame (2019), Spider-Man: Far From Home (2019), and Spider-Man: No Way Home (2021). She also portrayes Pete Davidson's mom in The King of Staten Island (2020).

Tomei has also worked in theater. She was formerly involved with the Naked Angels Theater Company and appeared in plays, such as Daughters (1986), Wait Until Dark (1998), Top Girls (2008), for which she received a nomination for the Drama Desk Award for Outstanding Featured Actress in a Play, and The Realistic Joneses (2014), for which she received a special award at the Drama Desk Awards.

Film

Television

Stage

References

External links
Marisa Tomei at the Internet Movie Database

Actress filmographies
American filmographies